Ler is a village in the municipality of Melhus in Trøndelag county, Norway. It is located along the Gaula River between the villages of Kvål and Lundamo.

Ler Station is located in the village along the Dovre Line, and it is served by commuter trains on Trønderbanen. European route E6 also runs through the village. The best-known resident of the village is former prime minister Per Borten.

Ler was the administrative center of the former municipality of Flå until 1964 when Flå was merged with Melhus. It is also the location of Flå Church.

The sports club Flå IL are based in the village.

References

Melhus
Villages in Trøndelag